The 1889 Dickinson football team was an American football team that represented Dickinson College as an independent during the 1889 college football season. The team compiled a 4–1–1 record and outscored opponents by a total of 75 to 42.

Schedule

References

Dickinson
Dickinson Red Devils football seasons
Dickinson football